Nykøbing Falster (originally named Nykøbing) is a southern Danish city, seat of the Guldborgsund kommune. It belongs to Region Sjælland. The city lies on Falster, connected by the  Frederick IX Bridge over the Guldborgsund (Guldborg Strait) waterway to the island of Lolland.   The town has a population of 16,911 (1 January 2022). Including the satellite town Sundby on the Lolland side, with a population of 3,065 the total population is 19,976.

Overview
Nykøbing Falster is the largest city on the islands of Lolland and Falster, and is often called "Nykøbing F." to distinguish it from at least two other cities in Denmark with the name of Nykøbing. Nykøbing Falster is the seat of state and regional authorities. Additionally, a city in Sweden is called Nyköping, which means exactly the same thing ("new market") in the closely related language.

At the end of the street is a large plaza where special events are arranged. These include popular late-night events, which are held several times a year. It has a large central library in the center of town.

The town receives many visitors during the summer, especially from Germany.

History

Early history 

Nykøbing Falster was founded around a 12th-century medieval castle.  At the end of the 12th century, fortifications were set up on a peninsula on Guldborgsund for protection against the Wends, and these were later converted into Nykøbing Castle. The town of Nykøbing Falster grew up around these fortifications. After the Reformation, the castle was the residence of widowed Danish queens. As several queens of German descent resided here, many Germans came to the town.

Situated on a headland, the castle was protected from all sides. In its early days, the castle belonged to the royal house. Medieval documents issued in this region reveal that the royal court regularly visited the castle. This is the castle where Christopher II died (1332) and where Christian V was married (1667). Christian, Prince Elect of Denmark resided here. The castle was chartered in 1539. REF

The castle and the entire crown land on Falster were put up for sale in 1763 to help improve the poor state of government finances. The castle was sold for demolition, and only the modest ruin of one of the towers, Fars Hat (Father’s Hat in Danish) is in existence today.

Recent history
From 1970 to 2006, Nykøbing was the administrative seat of the former county of Storstrøm as well as the Nykøbing Falster municipality.

On 1 January 2007, the former Nykøbing Falster municipality merged with Nysted, Nørre Alslev, Sakskøbing, Stubbekøbing, and Sydfalster municipalities to form Guldborgsund municipality.

Main sights

The city has a few noteworthy buildings, including a wooden house from 1580 and Czarens Hus ("The Tsar's House"), named in memory of Tsar Peter the Great of Russia, who stayed there in 1716. The most noteworthy attraction is the city's old water tower, Nykøbing Vandtårn, which was built in 1909 and remains an icon of the city and the surrounding areas. Today, the water tower houses a small cultural center holding art exhibitions and cultural events.

Other attractions include:
 the City Museum (Bymuseet)
 the Middle Ages Center (Middelaldercentret), located in Sundby
 Ejegod Windmill with its toy museum
 The abbey church founded in 1419.
Guldborgsund Zoo. (formerly "The People's Park")
The fire fighting museum (Brandmuseet)

Transportation 
Nykøbing Falster has a railway station operated by Danish State Railways. It is the terminus for regular local passenger-train services from Copenhagen via Ringsted and Køge. International trains operating between Copenhagen and Hamburg called at the station until 2019, and are now re-routed via Flensburg. The Lollandsbanen also operates a rail service to Nakskov.

International relations

Twin towns – sister cities
Nykøbing Falster is twinned with:
 Lublin, Poland

Notable residents

 Sophie of Mecklenburg-Güstrow (1557–1631 in Nykøbing Falster), Queen of Denmark and Norway by marriage to Frederick II of Denmark, mother of King Christian IV of Denmark
 Anne Palles (1619–executed for sorcery in 1693), an alleged witch, hired in Nykøbing Falster by a woman to drug and murder her abusive and violent husband
 Ludvig Grundtvig (1836–1901), a Danish photographer and portrait painter
 Ingeborg Tolderlund (1848–1935), a Danish women's rights activist and suffragist
 Christian Blangstrup (1857–1926), a Danish encyclopedist
 Peter Freuchen (1886–1957), a Danish Arctic explorer, author, journalist and anthropologist
 Gert Petersen (1927–2009), a journalist and politician who helped found the Socialist People's Party
 Claus Meyer (born 1963), a culinary entrepreneur, food activist, cookbook author and TV host
 Martin Geertsen (born 1970), Venstre party politician
 Pilgrimz (1998–2013), a local rock band

Sport 

 Carl Andersen (1879–1967), a gymnast at the 1908 Summer Olympics and later an architect
 Henrik Danielsen (born 1966), a Danish-Icelandic chess grandmaster and Icelandic Chess Champion in 2009
 Jørgen Nielsen (born 1971), a Danish former football goalkeeper, 340 club caps
 Michael Hansen (born 1971), a Danish former professional football player, over 460 club caps
 Claus Jensen (born 1977), a former footballer, 310 club caps and 47 for Denmark
 Esben Hansen (born 1981), a Danish former football midfielder, 230 club caps
 Anders Due (born 1982), a Danish footballer, 270 club caps
 Johanna Rasmussen (born 1983), a Danish professional footballer, 152 caps for Denmark
 Sara Petersen (born 1987), a Danish hurdler, silver medallist at the 2016 Summer Olympics
 Mikkel Rygaard Jensen (born 1990), a Danish footballer with over 300 club caps
 Mikkel Mac (born 1992), a Danish racing driver
 Mikkel Michelsen (born 1994), a Danish speedway rider
 Rikke Sevecke (born 1996), a Danish women's football defender

See also 

Guldborgsund
Gedser
Guldborg
Marielyst
Nagelsti
Nykøbing Falster Håndboldklub
Nørre Alslev
Nysted
Øster Toreby
Sakskøbing
Stubbekøbing
Sundby
Toreby

References 

 Municipal statistics: NetBorger Kommunefakta, delivered from KMD aka Kommunedata (Municipal Data)
 Municipal mergers and neighbors: Eniro new municipalities map

External links 

Nykøbing Falster Tourist Information website
 

Municipal seats of Region Zealand
Municipal seats of Denmark
Former municipalities of Denmark
Cities and towns in Region Zealand
Port cities and towns in Denmark
Port cities and towns of the Baltic Sea
Guldborgsund Municipality
Falster